Hathorn is a surname. Notable people with the surname include:

David Hathorn (born 1962), South African businessman
Gina Hathorn (born 1946), British alpine skier
Henry H. Hathorn (1813–1887), American politician
John Hathorn (1749–1825), American politician
Libby Hathorn, Australian writer
Linda Hathorn (born 1982), Canadian women's soccer player
Maitland Hathorn (1878–1920), South African cricketer

See also
Hathorn Hall, academic building at Bates College in Lewiston, Maine, United States
Hathorne